Sancho de Andrade de Figueroa (1632–1702) was a Roman Catholic prelate who served as Bishop of Quito (1688–1702) and Bishop of Ayacucho o Huamanga (1679–1688).

Biography
Sancho de Andrade de Figueroa was born in Santiago de Compostela, Spain in 1632 and ordained a priest in 1661. On 12 June 1679, he was appointed during the papacy of Pope Innocent XI as Bishop of Ayacucho o Huamanga. On 14 April 1680, he was consecrated bishop by Lucas Fernández de Piedrahita, Bishop of Panamá. On 15 November 1688, he was appointed during the papacy of Pope Innocent XI as Bishop of Quito. He served as Bishop of Quito until his death in 1702.

While bishop, he was the principal consecrator of Martín de Híjar y Mendoza, Bishop of Concepción (1694).

References

External links and additional sources
 (for Chronology of Bishops)
 (for Chronology of Bishops)
 (for Chronology of Bishops) 
 (for Chronology of Bishops) 

1632 births
1702 deaths
People from Santiago de Compostela
17th-century Roman Catholic bishops in Peru
17th-century Roman Catholic bishops in Ecuador
Bishops appointed by Pope Innocent XI
Roman Catholic missionaries in Ecuador
Spanish expatriates in Ecuador
18th-century Roman Catholic bishops in New Granada
Roman Catholic bishops of Quito
Roman Catholic bishops of Ayacucho